Gajówka  is a village in the administrative district of Gmina Sobków, within Jędrzejów County, Świętokrzyskie Voivodeship, in south-central Poland.
It lies north-east of Jędrzejów County in the border with Kielce County.

References 

Villages in Jędrzejów County